is a district located in Aichi Prefecture, Japan.

About
Located on the central Owari Region. As of 1 October 2019 the population was 15,630 persons with a population density of 2,529 per km2. The total area is 6.18 km2. Currently the district has the town of Toyoyama.

Description

About
During the old days, the district extended as far as Nagoya Castle, but since Taisho Era to the 1950s, most of the areas were merged into the city of Nagoya.

Recently, there were proposals to turn the entire district into a city but the merger was killed due to differences of opinion. After the merger was killed, the towns of Kiyosu, Shinkawa and Nishibiwajima merged in 2005 (City of Kiyosu). Again in 2006, the towns of Nishiharu and Shikatsu merged into (City of Kitanagoya). And most recently in 2009, the town of Haruhi merged into Kiyosu. As a result of this merger, the district has only the town of Toyoyama.

November 1, 1963 - The village of Nishiharu gained town status. (5 towns, 2 villages)
April 1, 1972 - The village of Toyoyama gained town status. (6 towns, 1 village)
April 1, 1990 - The village of Haruhi gained town status. (7 towns)
July 7, 2005 - The towns of Kiyosu, Shinkawa and Nishibiwajima merged to form the City of Kiyosu. (4 towns)
March 20, 2006 - The towns of Nishiharu and Shikatsu merged to form the city of Kitanagoya. (2 towns)
October 1, 2009 - The town of Haruhi merged into the city of Kiyosu. This leaves Nishikasugai District with one municipality.

Economy
J-Air, a subsidiary of Japan Airlines, is headquartered in Toyoyama, Nishikasugai District, in the Nagoya Airfield Terminal Building. Nakanihon Air Service, a general aviation operator, is also located in Toyoyama on the airport grounds.

References

External links
Districts of Japan 
Aichi Prefecture

Nishikasugai District